The Futures of American Studies is a weeklong academic summer institute dedicated to presenting new work and critiquing the field of American Studies held at Dartmouth College in Hanover, New Hampshire. The first Futures of American Studies Institute was held in the summer of 1997. Donald E. Pease, Professor of English at Dartmouth College, founded, organizes, and directs the annual Institute.

Founding of the Institute
After the School of Criticism and Theory left Dartmouth for Cornell University in 1995, Dartmouth faculty member Donald E. Pease started the Futures Institute as an alternative summer program for faculty and graduate students. In 2017 the Futures Institute celebrated the twentieth anniversary of its founding.

Institute Description
The Institute is divided into two daily plenary sessions, which feature current work from Institute faculty, and multiple three-hour research seminars in which all participants present and discuss their own work-in-progress. Speakers in the plenary sessions typically examine the relation between emergent and residual practices in the field of American Studies from a variety of interdisciplinary perspectives. Participants come from a variety of programs and schools and represent fields as diverse as American history, social geography, American literature, gender studies, and the digital humanities. The Institute welcomes participants who are involved in a range of disciplinary and interdisciplinary fields and who are interested in current critical debates in American Studies.

Past Institutes

2017 institute
The 2017 Institute was the twentieth anniversary of the founding of the Futures of American Studies Institute. Faculty included Lisa Lowe, Dana Nelson, Cindi Katz, Branka Arsic, Christian Haines,  Alan Nadel, Susan Strehle, Patricia Stuelke, Russ Castronovo, David Golumbia, James E. Dobson, Eng-Beng Lim, David Eng,  Rachel  Lee, Karen Shimakawa, Soyica Diggs Colbert, Ronald Judy,  Donatella Izzo, Heike Paul, Liam Kennedy, Winfried Fluck, Hortense Spillers, John Carlos Rowe, Tim Melley, Heike Paul, Liam Kennedy, Eric Lott, Hamilton Carroll, Annie McClanahan, Colleen Boggs, and Dana Luciano.

2016 institute
Along with Institute Director Donald E. Pease, the institute co-directors were 2016 are:
 Elizabeth Maddock Dillon, Northeastern University
 Soyica Diggs Colbert, Georgetown University
 Eric Lott, City University of New York (CUNY) Graduate Center
 Winfried Fluck, Freie Universitaet, Berlin
 Colleen Boggs, Dartmouth College
 Donatella Izzo (Università degli studi di Napoli "L'Orientale"

2014 institute
Along with Institute Director Donald E. Pease, the institute co-directors were 2014 are:
 Elizabeth Maddock Dillon, Northeastern University
 Soyica Diggs Colbert, Georgetown University
 Eric Lott, University of Virginia
 Winfried Fluck, Freie Universitaet, Berlin
 J. Martin Favor, Dartmouth College
 Colleen Boggs, Dartmouth College

2012 institute
Along with Institute Director Donald E. Pease, the institute co-directors were 2012 are:
 Elizabeth Maddock Dillon, Northeastern University
 Eric Lott, University of Virginia
 Winfried Fluck, Freie Universitaet, Berlin
 J. Martin Favor, Dartmouth College
 Colleen Boggs, Dartmouth College

Notable Plenary Lecturers

Each year the Futures Institute brings practicing Americanists and well-known critics and theorists working outside American studies. Notable plenary speakers from the Institute's history include: 

 Hortense Spillers 
 Rita Felski
 Walter Benn Michaels
 Lauren Berlant
 Tim Dean
 Bill Brown
 Mark Bauerlein
 Janice Radway

Recent books written by Institute plenary faculty or students
 Eric Lott, Black Mirror: The Cultural Contradictions of American Racism, Harvard University Press, 2017 
 James E. Dobson, Modernity and Autobiography in Nineteenth-Century America, Palgrave, 2017 
 Soyica Diggs Colbert, Black Movements: Performance and Cultural Politics, Rutgers University Press, 2017 
 Giorgio Mariani, Waging War on War: Peacefighting in American Literature, University of Illinois Press, 2015 
 Eng-Beng Lim, Brown Boys and Rice Queens: Spellbinding Performance in the Asias. New York University Press, 2013 
 Hamilton Carroll, Affirmative Reaction: New Formations of White Masculinity, New Americanist Series, Duke University Press, 2011
 Johannes Voelz, Transcendental Resistance: The New Americanists and Emerson's Challenge, Re-Mapping the Transnational: A Dartmouth Series in American Studies, Dartmouth College Press, 2010, 
 Donald E. Pease, The New American Exceptionalism, University of Minnesota Press, 2009, 
 Jonathan Beecher Field, Errands into the Metropolis: New England Dissidents in Revolutionary London, Dartmouth College Press, 2009, 
 Jonathan Elmer, On Lingering and Being Last: Fictions of Race and Sovereignty in the New World, Fordham University Press, 2008, 
 Christopher Castiglia, Interior States: Institutional Consciousness and the Inner Life of Democracy in the Antebellum U.S.  New Americanist Series, Duke University Press, 2008, 
 Hester Blum, The View from the Mast-Head: Maritime Imagination and Antebellum American Sea Narratives, University of North Carolina Press, 2008, 
 Colleen Glenney Boggs, Transnationalism and American Literature: Literary Translation 1773-1892, Routledge Press, 2007, 
 Randall Fuller, Emerson's Ghosts: Literature, Politics, and the Making of Americanists, Oxford University Press US, 2007,

References

External links
Institute Faculty
Institute Facebook Page

American studies
Humanities education
Dartmouth College